Marina Ferrari (born 10 October 1973) is a French politician from the Democratic Movement. She has been Member of Parliament for Savoie's 1st constituency since 2022.

Early life 
Ferrari was born ion Aix-les-Bains to a French mother and Italian father. She is also of Austrian descent.

See also 
 List of deputies of the 16th National Assembly of France

References 

Living people
1973 births
People from Aix-les-Bains
Université Savoie-Mont Blanc alumni
Paris Descartes University alumni
Deputies of the 16th National Assembly of the French Fifth Republic
21st-century French politicians
21st-century French women politicians
Women members of the National Assembly (France)
Democratic Movement (France) politicians
Members of Parliament for Savoie
French people of Italian descent
French people of Austrian descent